Armando Shashoua Sarmiento (born 31 October 2000) is an English footballer who plays as a midfielder for Spanish club Córdoba CF, on loan from UD Ibiza.

Club career
Born in London, Shashoua joined Tottenham Hotspur's Academy at the age of seven. On 26 January 2020, he moved to Spain and joined his brother at CD Atlético Baleares on loan until the end of the season.

Shashoua made his senior debut on 9 February 2020, coming on as a late substitute for Jordan Holsgrove in a 3–1 Segunda División B home win over Pontevedra CF. On 17 August, after four appearances, he moved to ATB on a permanent contract.

Shashoua scored his first senior goal on 25 November 2020, netting the equalizer in a 1–1 away draw against Real Madrid Castilla. In June 2022, he was close to a move to the latter side, but the move never materialized.

On 12 July 2022, Shashoua moved to Segunda División side UD Ibiza on a three-year deal. He made his professional debut on 14 August, starting in a 2–0 home loss against Granada CF.

On 25 January 2023, Shashoua joined Córdoba CF in the third level, on loan until the end of the season.

Personal life
Born in England, Shashoua is eligible to represent Venezuela, Egypt, Spain and the United States internationally through his parents. His older brother Samuel is also a footballer and a midfielder; both played together for Atlético Baleares in 2020.

References

External links
 
 

2000 births
Living people
Footballers from Greater London
English footballers
English people of Venezuelan descent
English people of Spanish descent
English people of American descent
English people of Egyptian descent
Association football midfielders
Tottenham Hotspur F.C. players
Segunda División players
Primera Federación players
Segunda División B players
CD Atlético Baleares footballers
UD Ibiza players
Córdoba CF players
English expatriate footballers
English expatriate sportspeople in Spain
Expatriate footballers in Spain